Paradrino is a genus of flies in the family Tachinidae.

Species
Paradrino assimilis Shima, 1984
Paradrino atrisetosa Shima, 1984
Paradrino dasyops (Mesnil, 1968)
Paradrino fijiana Shima, 1984
Paradrino halli (Curran, 1939)
Paradrino laevicula (Mesnil, 1951)
Paradrino laxifrons Shima, 1984
Paradrino longicornis Shima, 1984
Paradrino pilifacies Lahiri, 2006
Paradrino solitaris Thompson, 1966

References

Diptera of Asia
Diptera of Australasia
Diptera of Africa
Diptera of North America
Exoristinae
Tachinidae genera